The Twilight Sad Killed My Parents and Hit the Road is a compilation album by Scottish indie rock band The Twilight Sad, released by FatCat Records on 8 December 2008. The compilation is composed of live tracks, covers and previously unreleased material, and was made to "help fund their tour with Mogwai" in late 2008. The compilation was initially limited to 1,000 CD copies only, and was only made available at live shows, in independent record shops, and at FatCat's official website. The CD has not been repressed, but the album was made available digitally shortly after the CD release, and pressed on vinyl for the first time in November 2019.

The album artwork and name are homages to the 1990 Sonic Youth album Goo. According to vocalist James Graham, the Goo pastiche was the idea of guitarist Andy MacFarlane. Graham commented, "[The Twilight Sad] were playing in America with Mogwai [...] and Thurston Moore [came] to the gig. So we were thinking 'fuck' and hoping he didn't see the merchandise table. They haven't sued us though. Yet."

The first six tracks were recorded at the ABC in Glasgow on 9 October 2008. "Untitled #28" and "Untitled #27" were later featured on the band's second studio album, Forget the Night Ahead, as "The Neighbours Can't Breathe" and "The Room", respectively.

Track listing

Release history

Credits
 James Graham – vocals
 Andy MacFarlane – guitar, noise, mixing ("The Weath-er Is Bad")
 Craig Orzel – bass
 Mark Devine – drums
 Martin "Dok" Doherty – keyboards (tracks 1–6)
 Iain Cook – mixing, mastering 
 Andreas Jonsson – recording (tracks 1–6)
 Peter Katis – recording, mixing ("I Was Hoping Winter Was Over")

References

External links
Album synopsis at FatCat Records
Pitchfork article

The Twilight Sad albums
2008 compilation albums
FatCat Records compilation albums